Major-General Derek Gordon Thomond Horsford CBE DSO & bar (7 February 1917 – 5 October 2007) was a British Army officer who commanded the 17th Gurkha Division.

Military career
Educated at Clifton College and the Royal Military College, Sandhurst, Horsford was commissioned into the 8th Gurkha Rifles in Quetta in 1938. He saw active service in the Second World War and became Commanding Officer of 4th Battalion the 1st Gurkha Rifles in 1944. He led his battalion at the Battle of Kohima securing Hunter's Hill in Burma under heavy fire.

After a tour on the staff of General Sir Claude Auchinleck in Delhi, he transferred to the Royal Artillery and became an Instructor at the Staff College, Camberley, in 1950. After service in Korea, he was appointed Commanding Officer of 1st Battalion the King's Regiment on its formation in 1958. After service as Assistant Adjutant-General at the War Office, in 1960 he was appointed Commander of 24th Infantry Brigade in which role he was rushed to Kuwait to respond to the threat from Abdul Kassem who had seized power in Iraq. He went on to be Assistant Chief of Staff (Operations) at the Ministry of Defence in 1964, General Officer Commanding 50th (Northumbrian) Division/District of the Territorial Army in 1966 and General Officer Commanding Yorkshire District in 1967. His last appointments were as General Officer Commanding 17th Gurkha Division and Malaya District in 1969 and Deputy Commander Land Forces, Hong Kong in 1970 before retiring in 1971.

From 1965 to 1970 he was Colonel of the King's Regiment.

Family
In 1948 he married Sheila Kitson (née Crawford); they had a son, a stepson and two stepdaughters. Following the death of his first wife, he married Gillian Moorhouse (née Horsford), who brought him two more stepsons, in 1996.

References

|-
 

1917 births
2007 deaths
British Army major generals
People educated at Clifton College
Commanders of the Order of the British Empire
Companions of the Distinguished Service Order
Graduates of the Royal Military College, Sandhurst
Indian Army personnel of World War II
British Army personnel of the Korean War
British Indian Army officers
Academics of the Staff College, Camberley
Military personnel from London
King's Regiment officers